Irish singer and songwriter Róisín Murphy has released five studio albums, one live album, one remix album, five extended plays, 32 singles (including 10 as a featured artist) and 18 music videos. Murphy debuted in 1995 as lead singer of the electronic music duo Moloko. The duo achieved success in the United Kingdom, producing four top 20 singles. Moloko broke up in 2003 after Murphy had ended her relationship with musical partner Mark Brydon.

Murphy's first solo recordings, co-written and produced with Matthew Herbert, were released through three extended plays and were then compiled into her debut solo album Ruby Blue. Released in June 2005, the album was composed of electronic, jazz and pop songs. It reached number 88 on the UK Albums Chart and produced two singles. Overpowered, her second album, was released in October 2007. Incorporating various musical styles such as electronic, disco and house, the album received positive reviews from music critics. It reached the top 20 in the UK and produced three singles. In 2008, the album was shortlisted for the Choice Music Prize in Ireland.

Albums

Studio albums

Live albums

Remix albums

Extended plays

Singles

As lead artist

As featured artist

Other charted songs

Guest appearances

Music videos

Notes

References

External links
 
 
 
 

Discographies of Irish artists
Electronic music discographies
Pop music discographies